The Vélodrome Amédée Détraux is an outdoor velodrome in Baie-Mahault, Guadeloupe, France. Before 2010 it was called Vélodrome de Gourde-Liane. It has a capacity for 9000 spectators, making it the largest stadium in Guadeloupe. The track is used especially for cyclists from Guadeloupe.

It hosted for the first time in the Antilles the French National Track Championships in 2009 and the 2014 UEC European Track Championships in October 2014.

It has been used for tennis, hosting the 2016 Davis Cup tie between France and Canada .

References

See also
 List of velodromes

Buildings and structures in Guadeloupe
Sport in Guadeloupe
Velodromes in France
Sports venues in Guadeloupe